The Persian Corridor was a supply route through Iran into Soviet Azerbaijan by which British aid and American Lend-Lease supplies were transferred to the Soviet Union during World War II. Of the 17.5 million long tons of U.S. Lend-Lease aid provided to the Soviet Union, 7.9 million long tons (45%) were sent through Iran.

This supply route originated in the US and UK with ships sailing around the Cape of Good Hope to the Persian Gulf. From there, the materiel transited Iran to the USSR. Other supply routes included the Northern route across the Arctic, and the Pacific Route which handled US cargo at Vladivostok and then used the Trans-Siberian Railway across the USSR.

This Persian Route became the only viable, all-weather route to be developed to supply Soviet needs.

Etymology
English-language official documents from the Persian Corridor period continue to make the word "Persia" interchangeable with the name of Iran. In correspondence by the government of the United Kingdom, usage of "Persia" over "Iran" was chosen by Winston Churchill to avoid possible confusion with neighbouring Iraq.

Overthrow of the Shah

Following Germany's invasion of the USSR in June 1941, Britain and the Soviet Union became allies. Britain and the USSR saw the newly opened Trans-Iranian Railway as an attractive route to transport supplies from the Persian Gulf to the Soviet Union. Britain and the USSR used concessions extracted in previous interventions to pressure neutral Iran (and, in Britain's case, Iraq) into allowing the use of their territory for military and logistical purposes. Increased tensions with Britain led to pro-German rallies in Tehran. In August 1941, because Reza Shah refused to expel all German nationals and come down clearly on the Allied side, Britain and the USSR invaded Iran, arrested the monarch and sent him into exile to South Africa, taking control of Iran's communications and the coveted railway.

In 1942 the United States, now an ally of Britain and the USSR in World War II, sent a military force to Iran to help maintain and operate sections of the railway. The British and Soviet authorities allowed Reza Shah's system of government to collapse, and they limited the constitutional government interfaces. They installed Reza Shah's son, Mohammad Reza Pahlavi onto the Iranian/Persian throne.

The new Shah soon signed an agreement pledging full non-military logistical cooperation with the British and Soviets, in exchange for full recognition of his country's independence, and also a promise to withdraw from Iran within six months of the war's conclusion (these assurances later proved essential in securing his country's independence after the war). In September 1943, the Shah went further, and he declared war on Germany. He signed the Declaration by United Nations entitling his country to a seat in the original United Nations. Two months later, he hosted the Tehran Conference between Churchill, Roosevelt, and Stalin.

The presence of so many foreign troops in Iran accelerated social change and it roused nationalist sentiment in the country. In 1946, Hossein Gol-e-Golab published the nationalist song Ey Iran; it was reportedly inspired by an incident during the war in which Golab witnessed an American GI beating up a native Iranian greengrocer in a marketplace dispute.

Strategic need for supply to the USSR
After the British were pushed off the continent, Germany was essentially without any opposition in Europe until Hitler launched Operation Barbarossa, the invasion of the USSR in June 1941. To relieve pressure from the Soviets, British and American leaders sought to open the Second Front . Realizing that this would take time, the western Allies made the strategic decision to provide Stalin with material support substantial enough to ensure that the Red Army could continue to engage the bulk of the German military. The allies established protocols that defined the type and amount of material that would be delivered and when. German military action on the Arctic route, prevented the US from meeting the first protocol. This caused increasing pressure on the Allies to develop the Persian Corridor.

Supply efforts
The Allies delivered all manner of materiel to the Soviet Union ranging from Studebaker US6 trucks to American canned food. Most of the supplies transiting through the Persian Corridor arrived by ship at various ports in the Persian Gulf and were then carried northwards by railroad or in long truck convoys. Some goods were later reloaded on board ships to cross the Caspian Sea and others continued their journey by truck.

The United States Army forces in the corridor were originally under the Iran-Iraq Service Command - later renamed the Persian Gulf Service Command (PGSC). This was the successor to the original United States Military Iranian Mission, which had been put in place to deliver Lend-Lease supplies before the United States had entered the World War. The mission was originally commanded by Colonel Don G. Shingler, who was then replaced late in 1942 by Brigadier General Donald H. Connolly. Both the Iran-Iraq Service Command and the PGSC were subordinate to the U.S. Army Forces in the Middle East (USAFIME). PGSC was eventually renamed simply the Persian Gulf Command.

Statistics
In addition to the Persian Corridor the Americans used Arctic Convoys to the ports of Murmansk and Archangelsk and Soviet shipping carried supplies from the west coast of the United States and Canada to Vladivostok in the Far East, since the Soviet Union was not at war with Japan until August 1945. This was not the only allied contribution via the Persian Corridor. About  of shipborne cargo from Allied sources were unloaded in the Corridor, most of it bound for the USSR and some of it for British forces under the Middle East Command, or for the Iranian economy, which was sustaining the influx of tens of thousands of foreign troops and Polish refugees. Also, supplies were needed for the development of new transport and supply facilities in Persia and in the Soviet Union. The tonnage figure does not include transfers of warplanes via Persia.

Supply routes

Supplies came from as far away as Canada and the United States, and those were unloaded in Persian Gulf ports in Iran and Iraq. Once the Axis powers were cleared from the Mediterranean Sea in 1943 - with the Allied capture of Tunisia, Sicily, and southern Italy - cargo convoys were able to pass through the Mediterranean, the Suez Canal, and the Red Sea to Iran for shipment to the USSR.

The main ports in the Corridor for supplies inbound to Iran were:
in Iran,
 Bushehr
 Bandar Shahpur (now Bandar Imam Khomeini); and
in Iraq,
 Basra
 Umm Qasr.
The main overland routes were from the ports to Tehran, and then
 Tehran — Ashgabat or
 Tehran — Baku
or, alternatively,
 Basra — Kazvin or
 Dzhulfa — Beslan.
The main port for outbound supplies (via the Caspian Sea) was Nowshahr.  Ships ferried supplies from this port to Baku or Makhachkala.

Other locations
Important smaller ports and transit points on the routes included:

in Azerbaijan
 Lenkoran;

in Armenia
 Yerevan;

in Georgia
 Tbilisi;

in North Ossetia-Alania
 Beslan;

in Iran

Ports
 Bandar Anzali
 Bandar Abbas
 Chabahar
 Noshahr
 Bandar-e Shah (now Bandar Torkoman)
 Amir Abad port
 Khoramshahr
 Bushehr
 Assalouyeh
 Mahshahr
 Bandar Shahpur
 Fereydunkenar 

Cities
 Andimeshk
 Tehran
 Tabriz
 Hamadan
 Isfahan
 Karaj
 Khorramabad
 Kashan
 Malayer
 Mashad
 Mianeh
 Sari, Iran
 Semnan
 Shahroud
 Shiraz
 Tabriz
 Qom
 Zanjan
 Zahedan

in Turkmenistan
Ports
 Krasnovodsk

Cities
 Ashgabat
 Kizyl Arvat
 Kizyl Atrek

Personnel
Cargo was principally handled by special British and American transportation units from the nations' respective combat service support branches, such as the Royal Army Service Corps and the United States Army Quartermaster Corps. Many Allied civilian workers, such as stevedores and railway engineers, were also employed on the corridor. Many skilled engineers, accountants, and other professionals who volunteered or were drafted into the armed services were made warrant officers to help oversee the complex supply operations.

In addition to providing logistical support to the Iranians, the Allies offered other services as well. The Americans in particular were viewed as more neutral since they had no colonial past in the country as did the British and Soviets. The Americans contributed special expertise to the young Shah's government. Colonel Norman Schwarzkopf, Sr., who at the outbreak of the war was serving as superintendent of the New Jersey State Police was in August 1942 put in charge of training the Imperial Iranian Gendarmerie (his son, Norman Schwarzkopf, Jr., would command coalition forces fifty years later during the Persian Gulf War.)

Equipment
To help operate trains on the demanding Trans-Iranian Railway route, the US supplied large numbers of ALCO diesel locomotives, which were more suitable than steam locomotives. About 3000 pieces of rolling stock of various types were also supplied.

Volga River to Stalingrad

Beyond the Persian Corridor and across the Caspian Sea is the Volga River, flowing into the Caspian from the north.  This was a key route into the core of the Soviet Union. Stalingrad, at the easternmost turn of the Volga, was an objective of the Germans in their 1942 campaign partly for reason of its industrial capacity, partly as a convenient place to block Soviet pressure on the flank of their initiative towards the Caucasus, and partly for its name.  But it was also for blocking the river traffic carrying materiel north from the Persian Corridor.  The Battle of Stalingrad (23 August 1942 – 2 February 1943) reopened the river.

See also
 History of Iran
 Mediterranean and Middle East Theatre
 Military history of the Soviet Union
 Polish contribution to World War II
 Anglo-Soviet invasion of Iran
 Anglo-Russian Treaty of 1907
 Royal Road
 Operation Cedar
 Burma Road

Notes

Further reading

External links
 Trucks Lend Leased to Russia Amateur history page with detailed maps and statistics
 A Forgotten Odyssey website

Logistics routes of World War II
1940s in Iran
Iran in World War II
20th-century military history of the United States
Middle East theatre of World War II
Transport in Iran
Pahlavi Iran
Iran–Soviet Union relations
Iran–United States relations
Soviet Union–United States relations
1940s in Azerbaijan
Foreign trade of the Soviet Union